Marlena Kowalik (born 9 June 1984) is a German-born Polish footballer who plays as a midfielder. She has been a member of the Poland women's national team.

Club career
Kowalik has played for FCR Duisburg and SG Essen-Schönebeck in the German Bundesliga and for Pogoń Szczecin in the Polish Esktraliga.

References

1984 births
Living people
Citizens of Poland through descent
Polish women's footballers
Women's association football midfielders
Poland women's international footballers
People from Homberg (Efze)
Sportspeople from Kassel (region)
Footballers from Hesse
German women's footballers
FCR 2001 Duisburg players
SGS Essen players
Frauen-Bundesliga players
German people of Polish descent